Frank R. Licht (March 3, 1916May 30, 1987) was an American politician and the 67th Governor of Rhode Island from 1969 to 1973, serving as the first Jewish governor in Rhode Island state history. He was also an associate justice of the Rhode Island Superior Court from 1956 to 1968 and member of the Rhode Island Senate from 1949 to 1956.

Early life and career

Licht was born on March 3, 1916 in Providence, Rhode Island. He was the son of Rose (Kassed) and Jacob Licht. His parents were Russian Jewish immigrants. He graduated from Brown University in 1938 and Harvard Law School in 1941, where he was a member of the Phi Beta Kappa Society at both universities. In 1946, he married Dorothy Shirley Krauss; they had three daughters, and eight grandchildren.

In 1942 Licht was admitted to the Rhode Island bar, where he served as a law clerk for Judge John C. Mahoney of the United States Court of Appeals for the First Circuit in Boston. He was a partner with the Providence firm of Letts & Quinn from 1943 to 1956 and was an active member of the Freemasons.

Licht was elected to the Rhode Island Senate in 1949 and served there until 1956. He sat on the Superior Court of Rhode Island from 1956 to 1968. During his time on the Superior Court, Licht was founding member of the Providence Human Rights Commission, was the Chairman of the Chapin Hospital Commission, and was a general lecturer at Bryant College in Smithfield, Rhode Island, where he was a member of Delta Sigma Rho, a national debating fraternity.

Governor of Rhode Island

In 1968 Licht announced his intention to run for the Democratic nominee for Governor of Rhode Island. During the campaign Licht was seen as the underdog candidate against three term incumbent, later Secretary of the Navy, and U.S. Senator, John Chafee. On November 5, 1968, Licht beat Chafee in a close election, winning with only 51% of the vote. He served as the first Jewish governor of the state of Rhode Island from 1969 to 1973.

As governor, he reversed campaign promises he made in 1968 and 1970, pushing through Rhode Island's first income tax in order to resolve a worsening fiscal crisis. He signed the tax bill minutes after the Senate had passed it on a 26–24 vote, against the backdrop of some 500 angry demonstrators in the State House. During his term as governor, Licht approved more business projects than any other governor in Rhode Island's history, and helped create the Rhode Island Department of Social Rehabilitation Services, and the Rhode Island Department of Mental Health, Retardation, and Hospitals. Licht took a strong stand on environmental protection, playing a big role in revitalizing the New England Water Pollution Control Commission. He created an eleven-member Governor's Council on Environmental Quality, expanding regulatory authority against air and water pollution, and providing tax credits to businesses that included pollution-control systems into their operations. In 1973 Governor Licht did not run for reelection due his unpopularity for implementing a temporary statewide sales tax.

Later life and death

After leaving office as governor, Licht returned to practicing law in Rhode Island. The Providence County Courthouse  in College Hill, Providence, where the Rhode Island Superior Court, the Rhode Island Supreme Court, and the Rhode Island Law Library are located, and where Licht served as a justice of the Rhode Island Superior Court, was named the Frank Licht Judicial Complex in 1986, in honor of the former governor, and justice of the court.

Frank Licht was the uncle of Richard A. Licht, who was Lieutenant Governor of Rhode Island from 1985 to 1989 and unsuccessfully challenged John Chafee for the U.S. Senate seat he held in 1988.

On May 30, 1987, Licht died of cancer at Roger Williams Hospital, in Providence Rhode Island. He was survived by his father, Jacob Licht; his wife, Dorothy; his three daughters, and four grandchildren. Michael Dukakis, the Governor of Massachusetts, the later 1988 Democratic nominee for President, and friend of Governor Licht, attended, and spoke at his funeral in 1987.

References 

 Frank Licht biographical notes at the University of Rhode Island
 "Governor of Rhode Island Signs Income Tax Measure", The New York Times, February 27, 1971, p. 9.

1916 births
1987 deaths
American people of Russian-Jewish descent
Brown University alumni
Deaths from cancer in Rhode Island
Democratic Party governors of Rhode Island
Harvard Law School alumni
Jewish American state governors of the United States
Politicians from Providence, Rhode Island
Rhode Island lawyers
Democratic Party Rhode Island state senators
Rhode Island state court judges
Jewish American people in Rhode Island politics
20th-century American lawyers
20th-century American politicians
20th-century American judges
20th-century American Jews